Dr Ruth Bensusan-Butt, née Bensusan, (1877-1957) was the first female medical doctor in Colchester.

She was the sister-in-law of the painter Lucien Pissarro, who had married Esther Bensusan, Ruth's older sister.

She was born in Anerley to a Jewish family.  When the family moved to Upper Norwood she went to Sydenham High School. She trained at the University of Zurich, the Royal Free Hospital and in Dublin and qualified in 1904.  She spent several years in Italy and was married in Naples in 1910.

When an earthquake struck Italy in 1907, Bensusan organised food, medical supplies and clothes for the refugees from Rome, She later sailed, along with doctors Caroline Matthews and Worthington, to the scene of the quake in Calabria.

In 1909 she went to the Fabian Society summer school in North Wales and became an active suffragist, sometimes marching in her medical gown.  She sold copies of the Webbs' Minority report on the Poor Law.

She and her husband, Geoffrey Crawford Butt,  bought The Minories, Colchester in 1915.   She used the front rooms  as her consulting rooms, and also opened Colchester's first infant nursery there.  She sold the building and the garden to the Victor Batte-Lay Trust in 1956.

She became an active member of the Socialist Medical Association and organised a debate on "A State Medical Service" at the Colchester branch of the British Medical Association in January 1932.

She had three children, John, Barbara  and David Bensusan-Butt a prominent English economist. Barbara and David were twins 

A blue plaque in her memory was placed at The Minories in 2017.

References 

British general practitioners
1877 births
1957 deaths
20th-century English medical doctors